Janjaranwali or Jenjeranwali , is a town in Bahawalnagar District in Punjab, Pakistan on the bank of the Hakra canal, near the Indian border. Residents of Basti serve in various government departments like the Pakistan Civil Aviation Authority, Army, and the Public Health Engineering Department.

Populated places in Bahawalnagar District